Senator Stevenson may refer to:

Members of the Northern Irish Senate
William Ernest Stevenson (1871/1872–?), Northern Irish Senator from 1940 to 1945 and from 1945 to 1954

Members of the United States Senate
Adlai Stevenson III (born 1930), U.S. Senator from Illinois from 1970 to 1981
John W. Stevenson (1812–1886), U.S. Senator from Kentucky

United States state senate members
Alexander Campbell Stevenson (1802–1889), Indiana State Senate
Charles C. Stevenson (1826–1890), Nevada State Senate
Jerry Stevenson (politician), Utah State Senate
Job E. Stevenson (1832–1922), Ohio State Senate
William E. Stevenson (1820–1883), West Virginia State Senate

See also
Senator Stephenson (disambiguation)